The 1958 Oklahoma State Cowboys football team represented Oklahoma State University–Stillwater as an independent during the 1958 NCAA University Division football season. In their fourth season under head coach Cliff Speegle, the Cowboys compiled an 8–3 record, were ranked No. 19 in the final AP Poll, and outscored opponents by a combined total of 201 to 134.

End Jim Wood was selected by the American Football Coaches Association as a first-team player on the 1958 College Football All-America Team; he was Oklahoma State's first All-American since 1946.

On offense, the 1958 team averaged 18.3 points scored, 196.6 rushing yards, and 81.0 passing yards per game.  On defense, the team allowed an average of 12.2 points scored, 147.9 rushing yards and 86.5 passing yards per game. The team's statistical leaders included fullback Duane Wood with 492 rushing yards and 42 points scored, Dick Soergel with 539 passing yards, and Jim Wood with 273 receiving yards.

The team played its home games at Lewis Field in Stillwater, Oklahoma.

Schedule

After the season

The 1959 NFL Draft was held on December 1, 1958 and January 21, 1959. The following Cowboys were selected.

References

Oklahoma State
Oklahoma State Cowboys football seasons
Oklahoma State Cowboys football